Ratcat is the debut extended play (EP) by Australian indie pop band Ratcat, released in July 1987, shortly after they signed to Waterfront Records. The EP was  placed on high rotation on Triple J.

Track listing

Release history

References

1987 debut EPs
Ratcat albums
Indie pop EPs
EPs by Australian artists